Dronninglund Hotel is a hotel in Dronninglund, Denmark. The hotel was established in 1981 and was refurbished in 1999. The hotel has 72 rooms.

References

External links
Official site

Hotels in Denmark
Hotels established in 1981
1981 establishments in Denmark